William Holland Caudill (born July 13, 1956) is an American former professional baseball pitcher.

Early years
Caudill attended Aviation High School in Redondo Beach, California, and graduated in 1974.  He was selected in the eighth round of the 1974 Major League Baseball Draft by the St. Louis Cardinals.

After three seasons in the Cardinals' farm system, in which he went  with a 3.57 earned run average, he was dealt to the Cincinnati Reds for Joel Youngblood just before the start of the  season. He went  with a 4.04 ERA his only season in the Reds' farm system, after which he and Woodie Fryman were traded to the Chicago Cubs for Bill Bonham.

Chicago Cubs
Caudill spent the  season with the Wichita Aeros of the American Association. He split the 1979 season between Wichita and the Cubs, making his major league debut on May 12. Though he had been used almost exclusively as a starter in the minors, he made his major league debut in relief. Already down  to the Houston Astros, Caudill was called upon for mop up duty. He pitched the rest of the game, giving up only one unearned run. Splitting his time between the bullpen and the starting rotation, Caudill went  with a 4.80 ERA and 104 strikeouts his rookie season. He recorded his first MLB win on September 29, 1979.

In 1980, Caudill went  with a 2.19 ERA and 112 strikeouts. He earned his first major league save on September 28 against the Pittsburgh Pirates, and was second only to Dick Tidrow with 70 appearances out of the bullpen for the Cubs. On April 1, 1982, he was the "player to be named later" from a 1981 mid-season deal in which the Cubs acquired Pat Tabler from the New York Yankees for a player to be named later. The Yankees then sent him, Gene Nelson and a player to be named later to the Seattle Mariners for Shane Rawley.

Seattle Mariners
The Mariners introduced a nautically themed bullpen car called the "Tugboat" for the 1982 season. It got off to a rocky start for the home opener when Caudill stole the keys during pregame festivities, leaving the Tugboat stranded on the left-field line and delaying the start of the game. On another occasion, when brought in to pitch in a one-sided game, Caudill appeared from the bullpen sporting a half-shaved beard. He acquired the nickname "the Inspector" after inspecting the Mariners bats for unused hits and discarding those he deemed empty. The team began playing the Pink Panther Theme over the Kingdome loudspeakers when he was summoned from the Mariners' bullpen.

Despite his antics, Caudill emerged as one of the American League's top relievers his first season in Seattle.

Caudill's 26 saves in 1983 mirrored his previous season's production, however, his record dipped  while his ERA ballooned to 4.71. Following the season in November, he and Darrel Akerfelds were dealt to the Oakland Athletics for Dave Beard and

Oakland A's
Caudill returned to form with the A's in the first half of the 1984 season. With the NL leading  Caudill was brought in to pitch the seventh inning, and he struck out all three batters he faced (Tim Raines, Ryne Sandberg, and Keith Hernandez).

From there, things seemed to turn around on Caudill. He went  in the second half with a 3.60 ERA and blew four saves. He finished 1984 with a career-high 36 saves, which was second in the American League only to the 44 of Kansas City Royals' Dan Quisenberry. Following the season, he was traded to the Toronto Blue Jays for Dave Collins and Alfredo Griffin.

Toronto Blue Jays
Caudill was manager Bobby Cox's top closer upon his arrival in Toronto, but lost his job to Tom Henke by the end of the 1985 season. The formula worked as the Jays won the American League East by two games over the Yankees.

The Jays jumped to a  series lead in the American League Championship Series against the Kansas City Royals, however,  was the first post-season that the championship series was expanded to seven games. KC came back to win the series in seven games (and the World Series); Caudill did not make an appearance.

A shoulder injury limited Caudill to forty appearances in 1986. He went  with a 6.19 ERA and just two saves as the Blue Jays fell  and fourth place in their division under new manager Jimy Williams. He was released during spring training the following season, and shortly afterwards, he signed with the A's.

Final season
Trying to rebound from a subpar season with Toronto in 1986, Caudill began the 1987 season with Oakland's triple A affiliate, the Tacoma Tigers of the Pacific Coast League. He pitched effectively enough to earn a call to the majors; however, after just a month with the A's, he suffered a broken hand after punching a man who was reportedly trying to accost his wife in a hotel parking lot in 1987. It effectively ended his big league career at age 30.

Caudill currently coaches and works for his former agent, Scott Boras, who is also a former minor league teammate and close friend.

References

External links

Bill Caudill at Pura Pelota (Venezuelan Professional Baseball League)

1956 births
Living people
American expatriate baseball players in Canada
American League All-Stars
Arkansas Travelers players
Baseball players from Santa Monica, California
Chicago Cubs players
Gulf Coast Cardinals players
Indianapolis Indians players
Major League Baseball pitchers
Navegantes del Magallanes players
American expatriate baseball players in Venezuela
Oakland Athletics players
Seattle Mariners players
St. Petersburg Cardinals players
Tacoma Tigers players
Toronto Blue Jays players
Trois-Rivières Aigles players
Wichita Aeros players